Juan Antonio Medina (born September 3, 1946) is a former Spanish handball player. He competed in the 1972 Summer Olympics.

In 1972 he was part of the Spanish team which finished fifteenth in the Olympic tournament. He played four matches and scored eight goals.

References

1946 births
Living people
Spanish male handball players
Olympic handball players of Spain
Handball players at the 1972 Summer Olympics